Très-Saint-Rédempteur is a municipality located in the Montérégie region of Quebec, Canada, along the border with Ontario. The population as of the Canada 2021 Census was 978. The municipality includes the town of Saint-Redempteur, and lies south of Rigaud along Route 325.

The local economy is based almost exclusively on agriculture.

History
In 1880, the Parish Municipality of Très Saint Rédempteur was created out of territory ceded by the Parish Municipalities of Sainte-Magdeleine-de-Rigaud and Sainte Marthe. In 1882, its post office opened, called Saint-Rédempteur, and closed in 1969.

On January 30, 2010, the parish municipality changed its statutes to become a (regular) municipality.

Demographics

Language

Local government
List of former mayors:

 John McCabe (1881–1896, 1897–1903)
 François Damien Tessier dit Lavigne (1896–1897)
 Joseph Jean Baptiste Sabourin (1903–1911)
 Ludger Cadieux (1911–1919)
 Joseph Antoine Braseau (1919–1923)
 Pierre Paul Sabourin (1923–1929)
 Joseph Edmond Eugène Sabourin (1929–1931)
 Joseph Wilfrid Sabourin (1931–1935)
 Joseph Jean Baptiste Eucharis Brazeau (1935–1939)
 Joseph Trefflé Ernest Sabourin (1939–1944)
 J. Alphonse Marleau (1944)
 Joseph Henri Paul Sabourin (1944–1945)
 Joseph Antoine Sabourin (1945–1957)
 Joseph Oswald Dasise Sabourin (1957–1965)
 Joseph Treffle Bruno Sabourin (1965–1971)
 Louis Joseph Rojer Thauvette (1971–1979)
 Joseph Gérald Conrad Neault (1979–1982)
 Claude Sabourin (1982–1993)
 Serge Brazeau (1993–1997)
 Joseph Aimé Jean Lalonde (1997–2017)
 Julie Lemieux (2017–present)

Education
Commission Scolaire des Trois-Lacs operates Francophone schools.
 École Sainte-Marthe in Sainte-Marthe

Lester B. Pearson School Board operates Anglophone schools.
 Soulanges Elementary School in Saint-Télesphore or Evergreen Elementary and Forest Hill Elementary (Junior Campus and Senior campus) in Saint-Lazare

See also
 List of municipalities in Quebec

References

External links

Municipalities in Quebec
Incorporated places in Vaudreuil-Soulanges Regional County Municipality